Frances Henry is a Canadian scholar and Professor Emerita at York University. She is a member of the Royal Society of Canada and the Caribbean Studies Association (CSA). She specializes in Caribbean Studies and is considered one of Canada's leading experts in the study of racism and anti-racism.

Research 
Henry is the author of The Caribbean Diaspora in Toronto: Learning to Live with Racism (1994) and Reclaiming African Religion in Trinidad: The Sociopolitcal Legitimation of the Orisha and Spiritual Baptists Faiths (2003).

In 2009, she co-authored the fourth edition of The Colour of Democracy: Racism in Canadian Society that is widely used in universities as a text.

Henry’s most recent work is He Had the Power: Pa Neezer, the Orisha King of Trinidad, about ‘Pa Neezer’ (Ebenezer Elliott).

Personal life 
Henry serves as Chair of the Toronto Wagner Society.

References 

Canadian academics

Year of birth missing (living people)
Living people